Recency bias is a cognitive bias that favors recent events over historic ones;   a memory bias. Recency bias gives "greater importance to the most recent event", such as the final lawyer's closing argument a jury hears before being dismissed to deliberate.

Recency bias should not be confused with anchoring or confirmation bias. Recency bias is related to the serial-position effect known as the recency effect.  It is not to be confused with recency illusion, the belief or impression that a word or language usage is of recent origin when in reality it is long-established.

Occurrences 
It commonly appears in employee evaluations, as a distortion in favor of recently completed activities or recollections, and can be reinforced or offset by the Halo effect.

In psychology, primacy bias (excessive focus on earliest events or facts) and recency bias (excessive focus on the most recent events or facts) are often considered together as primacy and recency bias.

Recency bias can skew investors into not accurately evaluating economic cycles, causing them to continue to remain invested in a bull market even when they should grow cautious of its potential continuation, and refrain from buying assets in a bear market because they remain pessimistic about its prospects of recovery.

When it comes to investing, recency bias often manifests in terms of direction or momentum. It convinces us that a rising market or individual stock will continue to appreciate, or that a declining market or stock is likely to keep falling. This bias often leads us to make emotionally charged choices—decisions that could erode our earning potential by tempting us to hold a stock for too long or pull out too soon.

Lists of superlatives such as "Top 10 Superbowls", Greatest of All Time (G.O.A.T.), and sports awards (such as MVP trophies, Rookie of the Year, etc.) all are prone to distortion due to recency bias.  Sports betting is also impacted by recency bias.

See also

 Anchoring
 Free recall
 Henry Molaison
 Law of primacy in persuasion
 Learning curve
 List of memory biases
 List of cognitive biases
 Nostalgia
 Outcome primacy
 Principles of learning
 Peak–end rule
 Reminiscence bump

References

Further reading
 Liebermann, David A. Learning and memory: An integrative approach. Belmont, CA: Thomson/Wadsworth, 2004, .

Learning
Cognitive biases
Memory
Psychological concepts
Psychological effects